Phulta is a village in Ganjam, Odisha, India. It is several kilometers away from the city of Berhampur. Fulta was the birthplace of Gaudiya VAISNA  ACHARY Bhakti Vaibhava Puri Maharaj in 1913.

Note: this is not the Fulta or Fultah where in 1756, a multitude of British settlers sought refuge after the nawab Sirajuddaula took control of Calcutta. That Fulta is on the Hooghly River, some 20 miles south of Calcutta.  Admiral Watson and Robert Clive was at Fulta around 6 December 1756, preparing to attack Calcutta.

Villages in Ganjam district